The Sarangani Marlins, previously known as the Taguig and Soccsksargen Marlins, are a professional basketball team in the defunct Metropolitan Basketball Association from 1998–2001 and Maharlika Pilipinas Basketball League since 2019.

History

Metropolitan Basketball Association (1998–2001)
As one of the most talented teams in the South, the SocSarGen Marlins were able to reach the quarterfinals in the MBA's inaugural season. The Marlins were bannered by veteran PBA campaigners Maximo Delantes and Teroy Albarillo. SocSarGen finished its regular season record with 11 wins as against 11 losses, good for fourth spot in the Southern Conference. The Marlins' hardworking cager Maximo Delantes figured prominently in the MVP race but couldn't make it to the MBA mythical five due to his team's disastrous stints in each of the playoffs.

Coach Biboy Ravanes was replaced by fellow ex-pro Willie Generalao at the Marlins' bench at the start of the 2000 MBA season. SocSarGen was fifth in the standings in the Southern Conference with four wins and eight losses.

In 2001, the team was renamed as Taguig Marlins in the second phase conference. The Marlins finished last in both phases of the 2001 MBA season with a combined record of five wins and 23 losses.

Current roster

Head coaches

All-time Roster

 Joel Victor Jariel
 Johnny Galavin
 Norman Gonzales
 Ryan Regalado
 Ramon Retaga Jr.
 Abraham Santos
 Froilan Saquillo

Notable players

Teroy Albarillo
Orly Alvarado 
Christopher Corbin 
Max Delantes 
Chandler Donaldson
Hyon Mike Torres
Alwyn Flores
Nap Hatton 
Malai Malabanan 
Cisco Pacheco 
Mikko Santos 
Anthony Bernard Basona
Arnold Rodriguez
Jessie Lumantas
Michael Almonte
Edwin Pimentel
Arnel Mañalac
Aldrich Reyes
Edgar Echavez
Ariel Tizon
Joel Co
Paeng Santos
Cris Bade
Ricky Natividad
Paul Alvarez
Dindo Pastor
Lowell Briones 
Godfrey Cosio
Angelo Velasco
Joselito Celiz
Lito Aguilar
Neil Quirante

Coaches
Melchor Ravanes
Willie Generalao
David Zamar
Francis Rodriguez

Win–loss record (MBA)

Season-by-season records (MPBL)
Records from the 2021 MPBL Invitational:

References

External links
 basketball.asia-basket.com

Metropolitan Basketball Association teams
Maharlika Pilipinas Basketball League teams
Sports in South Cotabato
Sports in Sarangani
Basketball teams established in 1998